Megalomus is a genus of brown lacewings in the family Hemerobiidae. There are more than 40 described species in Megalomus.

Species
These 44 species belong to the genus Megalomus:

 Megalomus acunai Alayo, 1968
 Megalomus amnistiatus Monserrat, 1997
 Megalomus angulatus Carpenter, 1940
 Megalomus arytaenoideus C.-k. Yang, 1997
 Megalomus atomarius Navás, 1936
 Megalomus australis (González Olazo, 1992)
 Megalomus axillatus Navás, 1927
 Megalomus balachowskyi Lestage, 1928
 Megalomus carpenteri Penny, Adams & Stange, 1997
 Megalomus caucasicus Makarkin, 1991
 Megalomus darwini Banks, 1924
 Megalomus democraticus Monserrat, 1997
 Megalomus densistriatus Henriksen, 1922
 Megalomus elephiscus C.-k. Yang, 1997
 Megalomus fidelis (Banks, 1897)
 Megalomus flinti (Nakahara, 1965)
 Megalomus formosanus Banks, 1937
 Megalomus fraternus C.-k. Yang & Z.-q. Liu, 2001
 Megalomus hirtus (Linnaeus, 1761)
 Megalomus impudicus (Gerstaecker, 1888)
 Megalomus luigionii Navas, 1928
 Megalomus maculosus Makarkin, 1991
 Megalomus magallanicus New, 1990
 Megalomus marginatus Banks, 1910
 Megalomus minor Banks in Baker, 1905
 Megalomus moestus Banks, 1895
 Megalomus monticellii Navas, 1928
 Megalomus navasi Lacroix, 1912
 Megalomus nebulosus Navás, 1926
 Megalomus nigratus (Navás, 1929)
 Megalomus obscurus Steinmann, 1965
 Megalomus parvus Krüger, 1922
 Megalomus pictus Hagen, 1861
 Megalomus pyraloides Rambur, 1842
 Megalomus rafaeli Penny & Monserrat, 1985
 Megalomus ricoi Monserrat, 1997
 Megalomus sammnesianus González Olazo, 1987
 Megalomus setosulus (Walker, 1860)
 Megalomus tibetanus C.-k. Yang et al. in Huang et al., 1988
 Megalomus tinctus (Jarzembowski, 1980)
 Megalomus tineoides Rambur, 1842
 Megalomus tortricoides Rambur, 1842
 Megalomus uniformis Banks, 1935
 Megalomus yunnanus C.-k. Yang, 1986

References

Further reading

External links

 

Hemerobiiformia
Articles created by Qbugbot